Uhnin  is a village in the administrative district of Gmina Dębowa Kłoda, within Parczew County, Lublin Voivodeship, in eastern Poland.

References

Uhnin
Kholm Governorate